Riccardo Moretti (born 22 September 1967) is an Italian former rower. He competed in the men's eight event at the 1992 Summer Olympics.

References

External links
 

1967 births
Living people
Italian male rowers
Olympic rowers of Italy
Rowers at the 1992 Summer Olympics
Sportspeople from the Province of Latina